Delta Gemunupura College is a government school in the Kothmale Divisional Secretariat of Nuwara Eliya District in Sri Lanka.

References

Schools in Nuwara Eliya District